Quispamsis is a provincial electoral district for the Legislative Assembly of New Brunswick, Canada.

It was created as Kennebecasis in 1994 and included the town of Quispamsis and surrounding communities along the Kennebecasis River Valley. The district was reduced in size following the 2006 electoral redistribution such that only the Town of Quispamsis were within it so its name was changed to reflect that. Quispamsis means little lake in the woods.

The district will remain relatively unchanged following the 2013 electoral redistribution, losing only some of its eastern polls to Hampton.

Blaine Higgs who is the current Premier and Leader of the Progressive Conservative Party of New Brunswick, is the incumbent member from Quispamsis. Higgs was re-elected in this district in 2014, 2018, and 2020.

Members of the Legislative Assembly

Election results

Quispamsis

Kennebecasis

References

External links 
Website of the Legislative Assembly of New Brunswick
Map of riding as of 2018

New Brunswick provincial electoral districts